The Río Hatillo Formation is a geologic formation in Dominican Republic. It preserves bivalve, echinoid, gastropod and ammonite fossils dating back to the Early Albian period.

Description 
Río Hatillo Formation comprises a basal conglomerate, sandstones and calcareous sandstones, covered by a massive biogenic limestone. The formation was probably deposited in a shallow, near-shore environment as part of the Cretaceous Volcanic Arc sections.

See also 
 List of fossiliferous stratigraphic units in the Dominican Republic

References

Further reading 
 R. Myczynski and M. Iturralde Vinent. 2005. The Late Lower Albian Invertebrate Fauna of the Río Hatillo Formation of Pueblo Viejo, Dominican Republic. Caribbean Journal of Science 41(4):782-796

Geologic formations of the Dominican Republic
Cretaceous Caribbean
Albian Stage
Sandstone formations
Limestone formations
Conglomerate formations